The Corn Crib is a multi-purpose stadium located in Normal, Illinois. It is primarily used for baseball and is the home of the Normal CornBelters, a collegiate summer baseball team. The ballpark has a capacity of 7,000 and opened in May 2010.  It is located on the campus of Heartland Community College, hosting their baseball, softball, and soccer teams.

On October 20, 2009, the ballpark's name was officially announced.

Since the Spring 2019 season, soccer team FC Diablos has used the stadium as their home ground.

References

External links
Announcement on Ballpark
 Normal Baseball Games - The Corn Crib
 Normal Baseball - Things to do in the Corn Crib

Minor league baseball venues
Baseball venues in Illinois
Soccer venues in Illinois
Sports venues in Bloomington–Normal
College soccer venues in the United States
College baseball venues in the United States
College softball venues in the United States
Softball venues in Illinois
Sports venues completed in 2010
2010 establishments in Illinois